The 1998 Miami Hurricanes baseball team represented the University of Miami in the 1998 NCAA Division I baseball season. The Hurricanes played their home games at Mark Light Field. The team was coached by Jim Morris in his fifth season at Miami.

The Hurricanes reached the College World Series, where they finished tied for fifth after recording an opening round win against , a second round loss to eventual runner-up Arizona State, and an elimination game loss to Long Beach State.

Personnel

Roster

Coaches

Schedule and results

References

Miami Hurricanes baseball seasons
Miami Hurricanes
College World Series seasons
Miami
Miami Hurricanes baseball